Events in the year 1899 in Belgium.

Incumbents
Monarch: Leopold II
Prime Minister: Paul de Smet de Naeyer (to 23 January); Jules Vandenpeereboom (25 January to 5 August); Paul de Smet de Naeyer (from 5 August)

Events

 24 January – Unable to broker a coherent government policy on demands for proportional representation, Paul de Smet de Naeyer hands over the premiership to his colleague Jules Vandenpeereboom
 14 February – Belgian Antarctic Expedition research vessel Belgica freed from Antarctic ice.
 28–30 June – Violent protests in Brussels demanding introduction of universal manhood suffrage with proportional representation.
 29 July – Belgium among the 26 signatories to the Hague Convention
 31 July – Jules Vandenpeereboom offers his resignation as prime minister due to the failure of his government to pass its proposed legislation for proportional representation.
 23 October – Thomas Louis Heylen succeeds Jean-Baptiste Decrolière as bishop of Liège
 5 November – Belgian Antarctic Expedition arrives back in Antwerp on board research ship Belgica
 24 November – Bill introducing proportional representation on the D'Hondt method passed in the lower house by 70 votes to 63 with 8 abstentions.
 3 December – Antoon Stillemans, bishop of Ghent, suspends Adolf Daens as a diocesan priest due to his political activism for the Christene Volkspartij.
 30 December – Act introducing proportional representation published as law.

Publications

Periodicals
 Annales de le Société d'archéologie de Bruxelles, vol. 13

Reference
 Biographie Nationale de Belgique, vol. 15.

Books
 Stephane Mallarmé, Poésies (Brussels, Edmond Deman)
 Pol de Mont, Poètes belges d’expression française
 Max Rooses (ed.), Het schildersboek: Nederlandsche schilders der negentiende eeuw, vol. 3.
 Stijn Streuvels, Lenteleven
 Édouard van den Corput, Utilité des embellissements de Bruxelles: Nécessité de l'agrandissement territorial de la capital de la Belgique
 Emile Vandervelde, L'Alcoolisme et les conditions de travail en Belgique
 Émile Verhaeren, Les visages de la vie (Brussels, Edmond Deman)
 Villiers de l'Isle-Adam, Histoires souveraines, with ornaments by Théo van Rysselberghe (Brussels, Edmond Deman)

Art and architecture

Architecture
 Victor Horta, Maison du Peuple, Brussels
 Paul Saintenoy, Old England (department store), Brussels

Art
 Constantin Meunier, The Horse at the Pond

Births
 25 January – Paul-Henri Spaak, statesman (died 1972)
 21 February – Clara Clairbert, soprano (died 1970)
 28 February – Jacqueline Dyris, actress (died 1962)
 20 March – Albert-Émile de Beauffort, colonial administrator (died 1983)
 17 April – Gérard Debaets, cyclist (died 1959)
 12 May – Maurice Carême, poet (died 1978)
 17 May – Paul Ooghe, soldier (died 2001) 
 24 May – Henri Michaux, writer (died 1984)
 21 June – Jean Hénault, athlete (died 1983)
 30 June – Jean-Marie Plum, composer (died 1944)
 22 July – Elisabeth van der Noot d'Assche, aristocrat (died 1974)
 24 August – Albert Claude, Nobel Prize-winning biologist (died 1983)
 29 September – Gaspard Lemaire, Olympic swimmer (died 1979)
 20 October – Marnix Gijsen, writer (died 1984)
 3 November – Julien Vervaecke, cyclist (died 1940)
 8 November – Ernest Adam, politician (died 1985)
 15 November – Auguste Pelsmaeker, footballer (died 1976)
 20 December – Emile Brichard, cyclist (died 2004)
 31 December – Richard Declerck, politician (died 1986)

Deaths

 17 January – Camille Everardi (born 1824), baritone and voice teacher
 1 March – Abraham Mayer (born 1816), physician
 12 March – Edmond De Schampheleer (born 1824), artist
 1 April – Clara de Hirsch (born 1833), businesswoman
 28 May – Charles Piot (born 1812), archivist
 14 July – Charles-Joseph de Harlez de Deulin (born 1832), Orientalist
 27 August – Emmanuel Hiel (born 1834), writer
 4 September – Théodore Baron (born 1840), painter
 6 September – Jean Baptiste Carnoy (born 1836), priest-scientist
 27 November – Guido Gezelle (born 1830), priest-poet
 27 December – Henri Evenepoel (born 1872), artist

References

 
1890s in Belgium